is a Japanese voice actress from Kanagawa Prefecture, Japan. She is affiliated with Aoni Production.

Early life and career
Since she was eight years old, Minami Tsuda was fascinated with voice acting as she was influenced by her sister and grew from watching Sailor Moon and Pokémon. At the age of 10, she joined a choir, where she met actress and singer Eri Itō as her instructor for the next eight years. After graduating from high school, Tsuda quit the choir and attended Aoni Juku, the voice acting school of the talent agency Aoni Production, in Tokyo upon the recommendation of voice actress Michie Tomizawa.

Tsuda's first voice role was recorded incoming voices on mobile phones. In 2009, she took the role of Shige in Nintama Rantarō Musical, a musical theater performance based on the anime series of the same name.

Filmography

Anime TV series

Original video animation (OVA)

Original net animation (ONA)

Anime films

Video games

Dubbing

Animated TV series

Live-action TV series
 Game of Thrones (2013), Sansa Stark – Originally performed by Sophie Turner

Audio dramas
 Citrus (2015), Mei Aihara

References

External links
  
 

1989 births
Japanese video game actresses
Japanese voice actresses
Living people
Voice actresses from Kanagawa Prefecture
21st-century Japanese actresses
Aoni Production voice actors